"Young Waters" is Child ballad number 94.

Synopsis

The queen sees Young Waters ride to court.  A clever lord asks her to name the comeliest man in the whole company (at court), and her answer is 'Young Waters' is the fairest face that ever my eyes did see'.  The king is angry that she did not accept him.  She tries to appease him, but the king throws Young Waters in prison and executes him.

Commentary
The ballad is often supposed to be based on a historical occurrence, but no such event has been located that matches it.

A very similar Scandinavian ballad names King Magnus I of Sweden and his wife Helvig as the king and queen.  Folke Lovmandson finds favor with many ladies of court, especially the queen; a page stirs the king's suspicion; the innocent knight is rolled down the hill in a barrel set with knives.

References

External links
The history of Young Waters with questions of literary vs. oral transmission

Child Ballads
Year of song unknown
Songwriter unknown